Felipe Pardo y Aliaga (11 June 1806, Lima – 24 December 1868, Lima) was a Peruvian poet, satirist, playwright, lawyer and politician.

Biography
A member of Lima's aristocratic elite, his father was Manuel Pardo Ribadeneira, oidor of the Real Audiencia of Lima, and his mother was Mariana de Aliaga y Borda, daughter of the 2nd Marquise of Fuente Hermosa de Miranda.

He was, along with Manuel Ascencio Segura, the most important representative of early Republican Peruvian literature. After independence he participated in political affairs, defending conservative causes. He became a diplomat, representing Peru in Chile and a minister in the cabinet of presidents Felipe Santiago Salaverry, Manuel Ignacio de Vivanco and Ramón Castilla.

Pardo married Petronila de Lavalle y Cabrero, daughter of the 2nd Count of Premio Real. He was father of Manuel Justo Pardo Lavalle and grandfather of José Pardo y Barreda, presidents of the Republic.

Works

Essays and travelogues
Un viaje 1840  "El viaje del niño Goyito"

Poetry 
 El carnaval de Lima, 1929
 La jeta del guerrero, 1925
 La nariz
 Los paraísos de Sempronio
 El ministro y el aspirante
 A mi levita
 Qué guapos chicos
 Corrida de toros
 La lámpara, 1844
 A mi hijo en sus días, 1855
 Vaya una República, 1856
 El Perú, 1856
 Constitución política, 1859

Plays 
 Frutos de la educación, 1830
 Una huérfana en Chorrillos, 1833
 Don Leocadio y el aniversario de Ayacucho, 1833

References

1806 births
1868 deaths
Pardo family
19th-century Peruvian poets
19th-century Peruvian lawyers
Peruvian diplomats
Government ministers of Peru
Writers from Lima
Peruvian male poets
19th-century male writers
National University of San Marcos alumni